Cammells Sports F.C. was an English association football club based in Sheffield, South Yorkshire.

History
Little is known of the club other than that it competed in the FA Cup in the 1912–13 season.

Honours

League
Hatchard League
Champions: 1911–12

Cup
None

Records
Best FA Cup performance: Extra Preliminary Round, 1912–13

References

Defunct football clubs in South Yorkshire
Defunct football clubs in England
Hatchard League
Sheffield Amateur League
Works association football teams in England